Bohri Bazaar, also known as Bohra Bazaar, is a bazaar located in Saddar Town, Karachi, Sindh, Pakistan. It is one of the oldest marketplace of Karachi.

Bohri Bazaar was once the most famous shopping place in Karachi. It has historical importance similar to the Istanbul’s Grand Bazaar.

History
Bohri Bazaar was established in 1939 as a location for camps for British military personnel. The bazaar named after Bohra community of Karachi. The community has built a mosque called Tahiri Masjid at the centre of the bazaar. 

As of August 2022, the bazaar consists of at least 5,000 shops.

Incidents 
Bohri Bazaar was damaged in a fire in 1958, and again in the 1987 Karachi car bombing.

References

Bazaars in Karachi
1939 establishments in British India
Tourist attractions in Karachi